The name Frederick William usually refers to several monarchs and princes of the Hohenzollern dynasty:
 Frederick William, Elector of Brandenburg (1620–1688)
 Frederick William, Duke of Mecklenburg-Schwerin (1675–1713)
 Frederick William I of Prussia (1688–1740), King of Prussia
 Frederick William II of Prussia (1744–1797), King of Prussia
 Frederick William III of Prussia (1770–1840), King of Prussia
 Frederick William IV of Prussia (1795–1861), King of Prussia
 Frederick William, Grand Duke of Mecklenburg-Strelitz (1819–1904)
 Frederick III, German Emperor (1831–1888), German Emperor and King of Prussia.  He was known as Frederick William when he was Crown Prince.
 Prince Friedrich Wilhelm of Prussia (1880–1925), son of Prince Albert of Prussia and great-grandson of Frederick William III.

Other nobility with the name Frederick William are:
 Frederick William von Steuben (1730–1794), Prussian officer in the American Revolutionary War
 Frederick William von Hessenstein (1735–1808), Swedish statesman and soldier
 Frederick William Hervey, 1st Marquess of Bristol (1769–1859)
 Frederick William, Duke of Brunswick and Lüneburg (1771–1815)
 Frederick William Pethick-Lawrence, 1st Baron Pethick-Lawrence (1871–1961)
 Frederick William Mulley (1918–1995), British politician and economist
 Prince Frederick of Great Britain (1750–1765), son of Frederick, Prince of Wales

Other uses:
 Frederick William University (Friedrich-Wilhelms-Universität), a predecessor to the Humboldt University of Berlin
 Mount Frederick William, Jervis Inlet region, British Columbia, Canada

See also
 Frederick William I (disambiguation) 
 Friedrich Wilhelm (disambiguation)
 Frederick Williams (disambiguation)